Hundred to One is a 1933 British sports film directed by Walter West and starring Arthur Sinclair, Dodo Watts and Derek Williams. It was made at Wembley Studios.

Cast
 Arthur Sinclair as Patrick Flynn  
 Dodo Watts as Molly Flynn  
 Derek Williams as Bob Dent  
 David Nichol as Birchington  
 Edmund Hampton as Luggett

References

Bibliography
 Chibnall, Steve. Quota Quickies: The British of the British 'B' Film. British Film Institute, 2007.
 Low, Rachael. Filmmaking in 1930s Britain. George Allen & Unwin, 1985.
 Wood, Linda. British Films, 1927-1939. British Film Institute, 1986.

External links

1933 films
British sports comedy films
British black-and-white films
1930s sports comedy films
Films directed by Walter West
Films shot at Wembley Studios
Quota quickies
1933 comedy films
1930s English-language films
1930s British films